Moroccan Jews are Jews who live in or are from Morocco. Moroccan Jews constitute an ancient community dating to Roman times. Jews began immigrating to the region as early as 70 CE. They were later met by a second wave of migrants from the Iberian peninsula in the period which immediately preceded and followed the issuing of the 1492 Alhambra Decree, when Jews were expelled from Spain, and soon afterward, from Portugal. This second wave of immigrants changed Moroccan Jewry, which largely embraced the Andalusian Sephardic liturgy, to switch to a mostly Sephardic identity.

The immigration of Moroccan Jews to Israel has occurred throughout the centuries of Jewish history. Moroccan Jews built the first self-made neighborhood outside the walls of Jerusalem (Mahane Israel) in 1867, as well as the first modern neighborhoods in Tel Aviv, Haifa and Tiberias.

At its peak in the 1950s, Morocco's Jewish population was about 250,000-350,000, but due to the migration of Moroccan Jews to Israel and other nations, including Operation Yachin from 1961 to 1964, this number has been reduced to approximately 5,000. The vast majority of Moroccan Jews now live in Israel, where they constitute the second-largest Jewish community, approximately half a million. Other communities are found in France, Canada, Spain, the United States and South America, mainly in Venezuela, Brazil and Argentina.

The affection and respect between Jews and the Kingdom of Morocco is still palpable. Every year rabbis and community leaders across the world are invited for the Throne Celebration held every 30 July in Rabat. During the celebration in 2014, Rabbi Haim A. Moryoussef of Canada dedicated his book "Le Bon Oeil - Ben Porath Yossef" to the King Mohammed VI and offered him a handwritten blessing on parchment wishing him a healthy, long and successful life.

History

Moroccan Jews constitute an ancient community, immigrating to the region as early as 70 CE.  Emily Gottreich contends that Jewish migration to Morocco predated the full formation of Judaism, as the Talmud was "written and redacted between 200 and 500 CE." In accordance with the norms of the Islamic legal system, Jewish Moroccans had separate legal courts pertaining to "personal law" under which communities (Muslim sharia, Christian Canon law and Jewish halakha law-abiding) were allowed to rule themselves under their own system.

Particularly after the Alhambra Decree, many Sephardi Jews migrated from al-Andalus to the Maghreb as refugees fleeing the inquisition in Spain and Portugal. They are referred to as the Megorashim, while the Jews already in Morocco are referred to as the Toshavim. Many Iberian Jews settled in Fes and Marrakesh. In the following centuries, Conversos who had been banished to Iberian colonial possessions in the Americas and the Atlantic reclaimed their Judaism and also resettled in Morocco.

In the mid 19th century, Moroccan Jews started migrating from the interior of the country to coastal cities such as Essaouira, Mazagan, Asfi, and later Casablanca for economic opportunity, participating in trade with Europeans and the development of those cities. The Alliance Israélite Universelle opened its first school in Tetuan in 1862.

After the establishment of the State of Israel in 1948, and due to domestic strife in the 1950s, the next several decades saw waves of Jewish emigration to Israel, France and Canada. Shay Hazkani found that of the 20,000 who  performed aliyah in 1948-1949, 1,000 served in the IDF, of which 70% wished to return home. Only 6% managed to do so, given various bureaucratic obstacles like the Israeli confiscation of their passports and Moroccan resistance to their repatriation. Moroccan Jews emigrated for a variety of reasons. Some have emigrated for religious reasons, some faced persecution, and others left for better economic prospects than they faced in post-colonial Morocco. With every Arab-Israeli war, tensions between Arabs and Jews would rise, sparking more Jewish emigration. By the time of the Yom Kippur War in 1973, the majority of Morocco's Jewish population had emigrated.

As a protectorate of France, parts of Morocco were heavily influenced by French culture, while the same is true of the portions of the country that belonged to Spain. Traditionally, the Jews were classified as being French-Moroccan or Spanish-Moroccan depending on where in Morocco they lived, and remnants of these classifications can be felt today. These differences are reflected in language, foods, last names and even liturgy.

Most Jews in Morocco lived in desolate areas during the late 1930s. This was in part due to increased taxation by the French protectorate. In 1936, Léon Blum, a Jewish man, was appointed as prime minister of France. This gave some Moroccan Jews hope that they may be able to become French citizens at some point, as Algerian Jews gained French citizenship with the Crémieux Decree. Algerian Jews were granted right of passage to France, and this only furthered the desire of Moroccan Jews to embrace French culture to the extent of the Algerian Jews.

Early photographs of Moroccan Jewish families, taken in the early 20th century by German explorer and photographer Hermann Burchardt, are now held at the Ethnological Museum of Berlin.

A small community of around 2,000–2,500 Jews live in Morocco today. However, in a rapidly increasing trend, young men from the community are emigrating to Israel and France. As of 2017, according to The Economist, "No Arab country has gone to the lengths of Morocco to revive its Jewish heritage." The country has restored 110 synagogues and has the Arab world’s only Jewish museum. More than 50,000 Israelis visit Morocco annually.

Communities today

 Morocco: In 2012 it was estimated that 2,000–2,500 Jews still lived in Morocco, mainly in Casablanca. Other towns are said to have smaller, aging populations.
 Israel: The 1950s saw large waves of Jewish emigration from Morocco to Israel. Many Moroccan Jews were transferred to peripheral development towns while others settled in larger, established cities. Today, Jews of Moroccan descent can be found all across Israel.
 France: Large communities in France include Paris, Marseille, Strasbourg, Lyon and Nice.
 Argentina: Mainly in Buenos Aires and Rosario.
 Brazil: Amazonian Jews mainly in Belem (about 450 families), Manaus (about 250 families) and Rio de Janeiro (about 100 families), with small communities scattered throughout the Amazon region. 2009 marked 200 years of the first wave of immigration to the Amazon region. One distinguished descendant of Moroccan Jews in Brazil is Brazilian Senator for the Amazonian province of Amapá, Davi Alcolumbre, who became President of the Senate in 2019.  Also the local businessmen Isaac Benayon Sabba and Samuel Benchimol.
 Canada: In the 1950s Canada began extending visas to Jews from Morocco. Large communities developed in Montreal and Toronto. Moroccans were attracted to Canada because of its high quality of life and to Montreal in particular because of the French language. Toronto is known for its significant Moroccan population originating from cities such as Tangiers and Tetouan. In the recent past, however, an emergence of French-Moroccan musical liturgy and customs has been noticed even in this dominant Moroccan city. For example, the traditional Moroccan Bakashot, classical music sung by Sephardic Jews in the winter months across countries in the Middle East on Friday night, has come to life in recent productions by Magen David Congregation and Abir Ya'akob Congregation. 
 Venezuela: Concentrated mainly in Caracas.
 Gibraltar: The Jewish community in Gibraltar originates from Tangiers and Tetouan.
 United States: In 1972 the Moroccan Jewish Organization (MJO) was founded. Founding Members created Moroccan Services & a Synagogue in Forest Hills, NY named Shaar Hashamayim Sephardic Synagogue. Members and Participants of MJO went on to create other Moroccan Synagogues and Batei Midrashot / Houses of [Torah] Study in Manhattan (Manhattan Sephardic Cong.), Brooklyn (Netivot Yisrael), Fort Lee, NJ, Cedarhurst (HaChaim veHaShalom) and Philadelphia, PA.

Jewish Quarters in Morocco 
The Jewish quarters in Morocco were called mellahs. Jews in Morocco were considered ''dhimmis''' under Muslim law, meaning that they were a protected religious minority, that were distinguished from the Muslim majority, and were prevented from participating in certain activities. However, dhimmis such as Jews were tolerated, following the Pact of Umar in the 7th century, unlike the policy of intolerance that the Christians practiced with the Jews at that time in Europe. Sultans put Jews in the mellahs, as what most see as an attempt to ostracize the Jews, and keep them from being exposed to insurgents. The Jewish quarters in Moroccan cities were called Mellahs. The Sultans also wanted the Jews to be protected for political reasons. An attack on minorities was seen as an attack on the Sultan's power. The Sultan put the Jews in the Mellah for their safety, as well as to protect the Sultan rulings from being tested by insurgents. The word mellah is similar to the Hebrew word for salt,  (מלח). The term mellah refers to the salty, marshy area where the Jews of Northern Morocco were originally transferred and gathered. The mellah was not a ghetto and was not structured in a way similar to Jewish quarters in Europe. By the 1900s, most Moroccan cities had a mellah.

Culture
Moroccan Jewry has developed as a hybrid of the many cultures that have shaped Morocco itself, namely Jewish, Arab, Berber, French and Spanish.

Music

Even before the arrival of Sephardi Jews to Morocco, Moroccan Jews performed and developed the traditions of the Andalusian classical music and introduced it into their Liturgical music. In his book "Jews of Andalusia and the Maghreb" on the musical traditions in Jewish societies of North Africa, Haim Zafrani writes: "In Spain and Morocco, Jews were ardent maintainers of Andalusian music and the zealous guardians of its old traditions ...."

Cuisine 
One of the most famous dishes of Moroccan Jewish cuisine is the traditional sabbath meal: skhina (a literal translation of  "hot"), also called dfina ( "buried"). There's also a kosher version of pastilla.

Mahia, an aperitivo distilled from dates or figs, is traditionally associated with Morocco's Jewish community.

Henna
Traditional Henna parties usually take place within the week before a special occasion, such as a wedding, Bnei Mitzvah, or baby showers. During pre-wedding Henna parties, the Matriarch of the family (often the grandmother) smudges henna in the palm of the bride and groom to symbolically bestow the new couple with good health, fertility, wisdom, and security. The henna is believed in Moroccan tradition to protect the couple from demons. The grandmother covers the henna, a dough-like paste produced by mixing crushed henna plant leaves with water, in order to lock in body heat and generate a richer color. Normally, the henna will dye skin orange for up to two weeks. In Moroccan folklore, the bride is exempt of her household duties until the henna completely fades. After the bride and groom are blessed with the henna, the guests also spread henna on their palms to bring good luck.

Clothing
Although most Moroccan Jews tend to dress in styles of their adopted countries, traditional Moroccan clothing is sometimes worn during celebrations (Mimouna, weddings, Bar Mitzvas, etc.) or even during more intimate gatherings, such as Shabbat dinner. Men usually wear a white jellaba (jellabiya) cloak while women wear more ornate kaftans.

Mimouna
Mimouna is celebrated by many Moroccan Jews on the night following the last day of Passover. It has spread to be an almost national holiday in Israel where it is particularly prevalent in cities where there is a large concentration of Moroccan Jews like Ashdod, Ashkelon and Natanya.

Religious observance

Many Rabanim have passed through and sojourned in Morocco leaving behind great influence. In 2008, a project to preserve Moroccan Torah and the words of its Ḥakhamim was initiated. DarkeAbotenou.com was created by a few members of the Toronto Sephardic Community; devoting their time and effort to increasing global awareness of the customs and laws that Jews of Morocco live with every day. Daily emails are sent in both English and French containing the customs, laws, and traditional liturgy of both the French and Spanish parts of Morocco. This daily publication is currently broadcast in both English and French.

Liturgy
The observer of a typical Moroccan Jewish prayer service will note the presence of Oriental motifs in the melodies. However, unlike the tunes of Eastern rites (Syrian, Iraqi, etc.), which were influenced by Middle Eastern sounds, Moroccan Jewish religious tunes have a uniquely Andalusian feel. Furthermore, just as Eastern liturgical melodies are organized into Maqams, Moroccan liturgy can be classified by Noubas. The Moroccan prayer rite itself is also unique among Sephardic customs. The Moroccan nusach has many unique components but has also incorporated numerous Ashkenazic customs due to the country's proximity and exposure to Europe. Some customs of the Moroccan nusach include:
 Two blessing for Hallel: One blessing (ligmor et ha'Hallel) is said when the full Hallel is recited, while the other blessing (likro et ha'Hallel) is said when the abridged Hallel is recited. Other Sephardim omit the latter.
 Yiru Enenu: The blessing commencing with the words Yiru Enenu (translation: Our eyes shall see) is recited after Hashkivenu in the Arvit service after the Sabbath. Many Ashkenazim say this passage on every weekday night after Hashkivenu. This custom is discussed in Tosafot of Tractate Berakhot 4a.
 Le'David: Before the Arvit service after the Sabbath, three psalms are recited in a unique tune said to be the same tune that King David's soldiers recited them in. The psalms are Chapters 144, 67 and 44 (in that order). Some congregations begin this service with Chapter 16 in a tune that leads up to the other three psalms.
 Pesukei Dezimra: The opening verse of Psalm 30 ("Mizmor Shir Ḥanukat Habayit LeDavid") is added to the remainder of the Psalm during Shaḥarit of Hanuka. Other Sepharadim begin with "Aromimkha" even on Ḥanuka.
 Shir HaShirim: This is usually read between Mincha and Kabbalat Shabbat on the Sabbath eve. Other Sephardic groups tend to read it before Minḥa. Moroccan Jews chant Shir HaShirim with a unique cantillation. A common practice is for a different congregant to sing each chapter.
 Before the repetition of the Amidah in Shaḥarit and Musaf of Rosh Hashana and Yom Kippur, the hymn "Hashem sham'ati shim'akha yareti" (Translation:  Hashem, I have heard your speech and was awed) is sung. The origin of this verse is Habakkuk 3:2.
 The Moroccan tune for Torah Reading is unique to the Moroccan tradition, unlike all other Sephardic Jews who merely utilize different variations of the Yerushalmi tune.
 Some of the Moroccan Piyutim / Jewish Prayer Melodies and Songs - are said to come from the songs of the Leviim / Levites - that were sung on the steps leading to the Beit HaMikdash / Holy Temple in Jerusalem.

Religious customs
 Psalm 29 and Lekha Dodi are recited sitting down in the Kabbalat Shabbat service.
 Packets of salt are distributed to congregants on the second night of Passover, marking the first counting of the 'Omer. The significance of salt includes the commemoration of the sacrifices in the Temple and other Kabbalistic reasons.
 Pirke Avot is read during the Musaf service of Shabbat between Passover and Shavuot. As well, the custom is for pre-Bar Miṣva boys to read each chapter, and this is usually performed with a special tune.
 After reciting the hamotzie blessing over bread, there is a custom to dip the bread into salt while reciting "" (Translation: God reigns; God has reigned; God will reign for ever and ever). This "verse" is actually a compilation of three verses taken from Psalms and Exodus. The validity of this custom has been disputed among Moroccan Poskim since it may constitute an interruption of a blessing.
 Before the Magid section of the Passover Seder, the Seder plate is raised and passed over the heads of those present while reciting "" (Translation: In haste we went out of Egypt [with our] bread of affliction, [now we are] free people). It can be heard here.

Politics

Relationship with the Makhzen 
Moroccan Jews have held important positions in the Makhzen throughout their history. André Azoulay currently serves as an advisor to Muhammad VI of Morocco.

Communism 
In the 20th century, there were a number of prominent Moroccan Jewish Communists including Léon Sultan, Elie Azagury, Abraham Serfaty, and Sion Assidon. In the words of Emily Gottreich, "although the [Moroccan Communist Party] welcomed everyone, it held special appeal for urban educated elite; almost all of Morocco’s prominent Jewish intellectuals joined the party at one time or another."

Israeli politics 
All ten of the founding members of the Israeli Black Panthers—a short-lived 1970-1971 protest movement that worked against "ethnic discrimination and the 'socioeconomic gap,'" a group inspired by anti-Zionist university students—were children of Moroccan immigrants.

In Israel, many Moroccan Jews have risen to prominence in politics such as Amir Peretz, Orly Levy, Arye Deri, Miri Regev and Naama Lazimi.

Genetics

Over the years, the Moroccan Jews' DNA was examined and studied by numerous studies, the general image of it showed that in terms of Y-DNA it was mainly from the same Levantine source as the vast majority of the world's Jewry, meaning that they too are descendants of the Ancient Hebrews/Israelites from the Biblical times. In the case of Ashkenazi and Sephardi Jews (in particular Moroccan Jews), who are apparently closely related, the non-Jewish component is mainly southern European.

Genetic research shows that about 27% of Moroccan Jews descend from one female ancestor. Analysis of mitochondrial DNA of the Jewish populations of North Africa (Morocco, Tunisia, Libya) was the subject of further detailed study in 2008 by Doron Behar et al. The analysis concludes that Jews from this region do not share the haplogroups of the mitochondrial DNA haplogroups (M1 and U6) that are typical of the North African Berber and Arab populations.

Behar et al. conclude that it is unlikely that North African Jews have significant Arab, or Berber admixture, "consistent with social restrictions imposed by religious restrictions," or endogamy. This study also found genetic similarities between the Ashkenazi and North African Jews of European mitochondrial DNA pools, but differences between both of these of the diaspora and Jews from the Middle East.
In a 2012 study by Campbell et al., however, the Moroccan/Algerian, Djerban/Tunisian and Libyan subgroups of North African Jewry were found to demonstrate varying levels of Middle Eastern (40-42%), European (37-39%) and North African ancestry (20-21%), with Moroccan and Algerian Jews tending to be genetically closer to each other than to Djerban Jews and Libyan Jews. According to the study:"distinctive North African Jewish population clusters with proximity to other Jewish populations and variable degrees of Middle Eastern, European, and North African admixture. Two major subgroups were identified by principal component, neighbor joining tree, and identity-by-descent analysis—Moroccan/Algerian and Djerban/Libyan—that varied in their degree of European admixture. These populations showed a high degree of endogamy and were part of a larger Ashkenazi and Sephardic Jewish group. By principal component analysis, these North African groups were orthogonal to contemporary populations from North and South Morocco, Western Sahara, Tunisia, Libya, and Egypt. Thus, this study is compatible with the history of North African Jews—founding during Classical Antiquity with proselytism of local populations, followed by genetic isolation with the rise of Christianity and then Islam, and admixture following the emigration of Sephardic Jews during the Inquisition."

See also
 History of the Jews in Africa
 History of the Jews in Morocco
 History of the Jews under Muslim rule
 Migration of Moroccan Jews to Israel
 Moroccan Jews in Israel
 Operation Yachin
 The Jewish Community of Fez
 Amazonian Jews
 Moroccans

References

 
Jews and Judaism in Morocco
Ethnic groups in Morocco
Jewish ethnic groups
Sephardi Jews topics
Mizrahi Jews topics